Forerunner is a fictional character published by DC Comics. She first appeared in Countdown #46 (August 2007), and was created by Jimmy Palmiotti, Justin Gray and Jesus Saiz.

Fictional character biography
Viza Aziv's origin story, as well as the history of her race, is depicted in Countdown to Adventure #1.  The Forerunners' planet is the Earth of an alternate universe, ravaged by years of destructive war. The other "Nine Houses" (planets and dwarf planets) of the Solar System declared the planet a War World in which they would battle for occupancy. Survivors of the wars - the strongest and fittest - remained on the planet and interbred, unknowingly guided to do so by the Monitors. The process produced the Forerunners, a species possessing traits of the beings from other planets such as Green Martians and Saturnians. When the Nine Houses decided that the Forerunners were a threat that had to be eliminated, the Monitors intervened and formed a pact with the Nine Houses: the Monitors would keep the Forerunners from moving against the Nine Houses. For their own purposes, the Monitors would appoint one Forerunner as their Instrument of Righteous Death whom they also called Harbinger.

Viza is a member of a genetically engineered race of warriors tasked with serving the Monitors, and was assigned by a Monitor to kill anomalous beings inhabiting the Multiverse. In her first appearance, she battled Jason Todd and Donna Troy during their investigation of the death of Duela Dent. After failing to eliminate the two, she was denounced by one of the Monitors and suffered a crisis of confidence. Vowing to stay on Earth until she regained the trust of the Monitors, Forerunner was later contacted by Captain Atom (now called Monarch) who recruited her to aid him in his plans. He accused the Monitors of deploying a Harbinger, Dark Angel, to wipe out the Forerunner race. Monarch granted Forerunner an entire Bleed-based armada with which to wage war against the Monitors.

Countdown to Final Crisis

Monarch discloses that Viza Aziv was chosen as the Monitors' warrior because they feared something in her: she was an unexpected outcome of the breeding program which created the Forerunners. Viza is sent by Monarch to recruit the JLA's of Earth-10 and the Conjurers of Earth-33. The Conjurers were forewarned of Viza's arrival by Dark Angel, who disguised herself as an Oracle. Forerunner is captured and Dark Angel reveals herself; Forerunner ultimately strikes her down. Dark Angel escapes; when Monarch arrives Viza rebukes his attempts to gather new recruits. When they return to the Bleed, Monarch attacks Forerunner for questioning his authority. She attacks him, but realizes that damaging Monarch's suit would unleash a catastrophic explosion, and she relents.

Monarch informs Forerunner that the Arena tournament is about to begin, and that he doesn't need her services any longer. He teleports her to an unknown region of space. Forerunner is rescued by a passing freight ship, which is attacked by pirates. Forerunner boards the pirate ship, kills the captain, and evicts all non-necessary crew members. The ship is attacked by a Thanagarian fleet. The flagship, seeking the ship's original captain, demands her surrender. In response, Forerunner  challenges their leader, Golden Eagle, to single combat. Viza invokes the law of choice, a custom on her home world, empowering the victor to take any prize they desire. After defeating Eagle and his troops, Viza takes him as her prize; he's an initially unwilling sex slave. The ship reaches the Source Wall, which has a gaping hole at its center.

The crew encounter an Earth space shuttle with a young boy in cryogenic stasis, whom they bring aboard. Forerunner commands the crew to pass through the wall, where they see Monarch's forces battling the Monitors. Forerunner locates the Monitors' base, which leads to events seen in Countdown to Final Crisis #15: she attacks the Monitor named Solomon but Superman-Prime arrives and brutally bests her. In #13, she attacks Solomon again while Prime fights Monarch, again to no avail. Before Solomon can finish her, Darkseid appears, and convinces Solomon to join him on Apokolips.

After returning to the ship, Forerunner is told that passing through the Source Wall depleted the ships energy reserves, and that they only have forty-eight hours of power and oxygen left. The ship ends up trapped in no-space, and the crew are contacted by a sentient planet, who offers them the fuel they need in return for escorting a young planet across the sector. During the trip, they are attacked, and, at the young planet's request, Forerunner places a drop of her blood onto its land, allowing it to create antibodies from her DNA. When their task is completed, it is revealed that the young planet will soon make a new Forerunner race from Viza's blood. Viza decides to stay with the planet, and become the new race's Thought Mother.

Powers and abilities
Viza Aziv possesses considerable superhuman strength and resistance to injury. She was able to resist gunfire from an automatic rifle and is tough enough that Donna Troy was injured simply by punching her. Forerunner can move at speeds well in excess to that of a normal human being. Her rate of acceleration and maximum velocity has yet to be determined but she was fast enough that a normal human could not follow her movement. However, it seems, while generally faster than a normal human, these feats of considerable superhuman speed are only temporary boosts. Because of the general life-style of her species she has excessive weapon and hand-to-hand combat training. She has defeated numerous Supermen in the Multiverse although she proved no match for Superman-Prime. She possesses telepathy and the ability to become temporarily invisible, presumably from her Martian ancestry. She has also been seen throwing various types of spikes at enemies.  Viza also wears gloves with sharply tipped fingers that she can use as a weapon to slash at enemies.

References

External links
 Newsarama: Counting Down With Mike Marts: Countdown #45
 Comicon.com: Justin Gray's Forerunner To Adventure

Comics characters introduced in 2007
DC Comics aliens
DC Comics characters who can move at superhuman speeds
DC Comics characters with superhuman strength
DC Comics telepaths
Fictional characters who can turn invisible
Fictional endangered and extinct species
Fictional extraterrestrial life forms
Characters created by Paul Dini